Burst phase is the first ten cycles of colorburst in the "porch" of the synchronising pulse in the PAL (Phase Alternation Line) broadcast television systems format.  The frequency of this burst is 4.43361875 MHz; it is precise to .5 Hz, and is used as the reference frequency to synchronise the local oscillators of the colour decoder in a PAL television set.

This colorburst is sometimes called a "swinging burst", since it swings plus or minus 45 degrees line by line (hence the expression "phase alternating line"). This swing is used to set the centre frequency of the colour reference oscillator in the decoder. The swing of the burst phase distinguishes PAL from non-PAL lines, and produces the IDENT signal.

Television technology